Morenii Noi is a commune in Ungheni District, Moldova. It is composed of two villages, Morenii Noi and Șicovăț.

References

Communes of Ungheni District